Piki Films is a New Zealand film and video production and distributing company based in Auckland. Piki Films is known for producing Jojo Rabbit, Hunt for the Wilderpeople, and The Breaker Upperers. The name "Piki" means "jump" or "climb over" in the Māori language.

History
Piki Films was founded by the Oscar-nominated filmmakers Taika Waititi and Carthew Neal.

In September 2019, Jojo Rabbit won the festival's audience award at the Toronto International Film Festival and earned six nominations at the 92nd Oscars in 2020.

Productions

References

External links
 

Television production companies of New Zealand
Film production companies of New Zealand